The 2021 London Assembly election was held on 6 May 2021 to elect the members of the London Assembly, alongside the 2021 London mayoral election. The mayoral and Assembly elections were originally to be held on 7 May 2020, but on 13 March 2020 it was announced the election would be postponed until 2021 due to the COVID-19 pandemic. It was the sixth election since the assembly was established in 2000. Due to the previous term being extended to 5 years, those elected will serve only a three-year term until the next election in 2024. The election was held on the same day in 2021 as other elections in the UK; the UK local elections, Scottish Parliament election, and Welsh Senedd election.

Five parties had figured in the fifth Assembly: London Labour led by Len Duvall; London Conservatives led by Gareth Bacon and latterly Susan Hall; London Greens led by Caroline Russell; UKIP London represented by David Kurten (as part of the Brexit Alliance group led by its former leader Peter Whittle); and the London Liberal Democrats led by Caroline Pidgeon. This fell to four as the UKIP seats were lost.

Background

2016–2019 
In the 2016 local elections, the Labour Party won the post of London Mayor, as well as 12 seats in the London Assembly elections. The party polled over 1 million votes, which represented the best-ever result for any political party in a London Assembly election. The Conservative Party were the runners-up, winning 8 seats, followed by the Green Party (2 seats), the UK Independence Party (2 seats) and the Liberal Democrats (1 seat). The Women's Equality Party, meanwhile, achieved 3.5% of the regional list vote, failing to reach the 5% minimum threshold required for representation.

The following year, in the snap election on 8 June 2017, Labour polled 55% of the popular vote in London, winning 49 of 73 London seats in the British House of Commons. In the 2018 borough elections across the capital, Labour saw their best result in over 45 years, winning 47% of the vote. Both the Liberal Democrats and the Green party also gained seats across London.

UKIP Assembly Member Peter Whittle left the party in December 2018. He and the remaining UKIP Assembly Member David Kurten formed their own Brexit Alliance group on the Assembly. Kurten subsequently also left UKIP.

2019 elections 

In 2019, London was involved in two nationwide elections.

In the May 2019 European Parliament elections, the Liberal Democrats came first in London; winning the most votes in the London region with 27% and gaining three MEPs, their best result in the party's history. The Labour Party came second, with 24% of the vote, losing two seats. The Brexit Party gained two MEPs and Greens won 12.5% of the vote, holding their one seat. The Conservative Party failed to get a single MEP elected in London for the first time in the history of the party.

In the general election at the end of 2019, there was no net change in the number of seats for each party, although four constituencies in London changed hands. Across London, Labour comfortably won the most seats. Two members of the London Assembly were elected to Parliament: the Conservative group leader Gareth Bacon and Labour member Florence Eshalomi. Susan Hall replaced Bacon as Conservative group leader, and both Bacon and Eshalomi announced that they would not seek re-election at the 2020 London Assembly election.

Electoral system

The members of the Assembly are elected through a combination of both first past the post as well as closed list proportional representation; this system is commonly referred to as the additional member system. 14 members are elected in single member constituencies with the candidate receiving the largest number of votes becoming the Assembly Member for that constituency. An additional 11 members are also elected from the whole of London — with parties creating lists of up to 25 candidates — for a party to be included it needs to attain at least 5% of the vote across London. This process divides the remaining seats proportionally to the vote share of the parties with the use of the modified D'Hondt method allocating the seats. This system ensures proportionality with the 11 additional members being allocated in a corrective manner.

Campaign
The London Labour Party changed its selection process for assembly members so that party members select new candidates. The party started an investigation into a dispute over a "trigger ballot" organised by Momentum members to deselect Florence Eshalomi, Assembly Member for Lambeth and Southwark.

The Conservatives intend to stand candidates. Their constituency candidate for the North East, Ben Seifert, stood down and joined the Lib Dems in 2019.

Nominations for the Green Party's list candidates closed in January 2019. Their final list was headed by their two current Assembly Members, Sian Berry (also the mayoral candidate) and Caroline Russell. The other three individuals who sought the mayoral nomination are also all Assembly candidates: Shahrar Ali (list candidate in 2016), Peter Underwood and former Liberal Democrat Zack Polanski. Other candidates include Benali Hamdache (list candidate in 2016; sought to be the Green mayoral candidate in 2016, losing to Berry).

The Liberal Democrats announced a shortlist of 15 people to be list candidates. These were voted on by the party membership, with the results announced in late November 2018. The candidate list was reshuffled in May 2019 following the withdrawal of Lucy Salek, originally placed third on the list.

Candidates
Constituency candidates need to submit a deposit of £1000, which is returned if they get 5% of the vote. A London-wide list requires a deposit of £5000, returnable if the list gets 2.5% of the vote.

Constituency candidates

London-wide list candidates
† Also standing as mayoral candidate

Assembly members not standing for re-election

Jennette Arnold, Chair of the London Assembly and Labour member for North East London.
Gareth Bacon, former Leader of the London Conservatives on the Assembly and the member for Bexley and Bromley, was elected to the House of Commons as MP for Orpington at the 2019 general election.
 Tom Copley, Labour Assembly Member London-wide, was appointed Deputy Mayor of London for Housing.
 Andrew Dismore, Labour's Assembly Member for Barnet and Camden.
 Florence Eshalomi, Labour's Assembly Member for Lambeth and Southwark, was elected to the House of Commons as MP for Vauxhall in 2019.
 Navin Shah, Labour's Assembly Member for Brent and Harrow.
 Tony Arbour, Conservative Assembly Member for the South West constituency
 Steve O'Connell, Conservative Assembly Member for Croydon and Sutton constituency
 Alison Moore, Labour Assembly Member for London at-large
 Peter Whittle, Brexit Alliance Assembly Member for London at-large
 Nicky Gavron, Labour Assembly Member London-wide and Former Deputy Mayor of London

Opinion polls

Constituency

London wide vote

Results

Analysis
The largest vote increase was by the Greens, up 3.8% in the regional vote and gaining 1 seat, while the largest fall was by UKIP, down 5.4% in the regional vote and losing both their seats.

See also
 List of London Assembly constituencies

Notes

References

2021 elections in the United Kingdom
2021
London Assembly election
Assembly election